Terada is a Japanese surname. Notable people with the surname include:

People
Alicia Terada (born 1956), Argentine politician of Japanese descent
, Japanese hurdler
Haruhi Terada (born 1973), Japanese voice actress
, Japanese lawyer
Katsuya Terada (born 1963), Japanese illustrator and cartoonist from the town of Tamano, Okayama
Keiko Terada (born 1963), Japanese rock singer
Kenji Terada (born 1952), Japanese script writer, anime director, series organizer, novelist and scenario writer
Kiyoyuki Terada (born 1922), Japanese aikido teacher
Kokoro Terada (born 2008), Japanese actress
Minoru Terada (born 1958), Japanese politician serving in the House of Representatives in the Diet
Mitsuo Terada (born 1968), Tsunku (:ja:つんく♂)'s real name, a prolific Japanese record producer, songwriter, and vocalist
Noboru Terada (1917–1986), Japanese freestyle swimmer
Sakurako Terada (born 1984), Japanese curler
Shinichi Terada (born 1985), Japanese football player
Shuhei Terada (born 1975), Japanese football player
Soichi Terada (born 1965), Japanese electronic music composer
Takeshi Terada (born 1980), Japanese football player
Takuya Terada (born 1992), Japanese actor and singer
Torahiko Terada (1878–1935), Japanese physicist and author
Yojiro Terada (born 1947), Japanese racing driver

Fictional characters
 Yoshiyuki Terada, Sakura Kinomoto's teacher at Tomoeda Elementary School, from the manga and anime series Cardcaptor Sakura

See also
Terada Station (Kyoto), railway station in Jōyō, Kyoto, Japan
Terada Station (Toyama), railway station in Tateyama, Nakaniikawa District, Toyama Prefecture, Japan

Japanese-language surnames